Pharis may refer to:
 Pharis (mythology), a character in Greek mythology
 Pharis (horse) (1936–1957), a French thoroughbred horse
 Pharis (Laconia), an ancient city in Greece
 Pharis, a surname
 Billy Pharis, American basketball player
 Mark Pharis, American artist
Pharis and Jason Romero, Canadian musicians